Dhak Bhulla Rai  is a village in Phagwara Tehsil in Kapurthala district of Punjab State, India. The village is administrated by a Sarpanch, who is an elected representative.

Demography 
According to the report published by Census India in 2011, Dhak Bhulla Rai has 80 houses with the total population of 367 persons of which 199 are male and 168 females. Literacy rate of Dhak Bhulla Rai is 71.56%, lower than the state average of 75.84%.  The population of children in the age group 0–6 years is 47 which is 12.81% of the total population.  Child sex ratio is approximately 958, higher than the state average of 846.

Population data

References

External links
  Villages in Kapurthala
 Kapurthala Villages List

Villages in Kapurthala district